John Joseph Bonetti (June 1928June 27, 2008) was an American professional poker player from Houston, Texas.

Born in Brooklyn, New York City, Bonetti began playing poker at the age of 54, and won three bracelets at the World Series of Poker (WSOP) in the 1990s.

Bonetti also made several notable finishes in the No Limit Texas hold 'em WSOP Main Event:
 1987 23rd place - $10,000
 1989 16th place - $12,500
 1990 8th place - $33,400
 1992 12th place - $10,100
 1993 3rd place - $210,000
 1996 3rd place - $341,250

Bonetti finished on the television bubble, which was 7th place, of the World Poker Tour (WPT) Fifth Annual Jack Binion World Poker Open, winning $86,377.

Between May 1987 and February 2003, Bonetti won more than 40 poker tournaments.

On June 27, 2008, Bonetti died at the age of 80.

Bonetti's total live tournament winnings were $4,188,332. His 32 cashes at the WSOP accounted for $1,743,993 of those winnings.

World Series of Poker bracelets

References

1928 births
2008 deaths
People from Brooklyn
People from Houston
American poker players
World Series of Poker bracelet winners
Bonetti, John